This is a list of Active Royal Navy weapon systems.

Guns

4.5-inch Mark 8 naval gun

The  Mark 8 gun can be found on all the Royal Navy's frigates and destroyers and was used from the Falklands War to the War in Iraq.

The main purpose of the gun is naval gunfire support – artillery bombardment of shore targets. In this role the gun is capable of firing the equivalent of a six-gun shore battery. It can still be used as an anti-ship weapon.

30 mm DS30M Mark 2 naval gun

The 30 mm DS30M Mark 2 is a  automated naval gun system designed to defend ships from fast inshore attack craft armed with short-range weaponry. The DS30M Mark 2 system consists of a 30 mm Mark 44 Bushmaster II cannon on a fully automated mount with an off-mount electro-optical director (EOD). The system is fitted to all Type 23 frigates, Type 45 destroyers, Batch 2 s (OPVs) and several Royal Fleet Auxiliary (RFA) ships when they have the weapons package added.

Oerlikon 20 mm cannon

Browning .50-calibre (12.7 mm) heavy machine gun

7.62 mm miniguns

All Royal Navy ships carry miniguns for close in defence.

7.62 mm General Purpose Machine Gun (GPMG)

GPMGs are used for close in defence.

Close-in weapon systems

Phalanx 20 mm

The Phalanx Close-in Weapon System (CIWS) is an anti-ship missile defence system. It is also currently in the designs for the new Type 26 frigate. During Operation Telic, Phalanx guns were removed from ships and were crewed by Royal Navy personnel based at Basra airport, as part of the Centurion C-RAM system.

The last active Goalkeeper system was removed from  when she entered extended readiness in 2016.

Torpedoes

Spearfish torpedo

It carries a  explosive charge and is guided either by its in-built sonar or via a copper-cadmium wire.

The Spearfish is undergoing a major upgrade program which will provide sophisticated advances in its homing, warheads, tactical and fueling systems, as well an upgraded guidance link.

Sting Ray torpedo

The Sting Ray torpedo is the Royal Navy's lightweight torpedo which is designed to be carried by the anti-submarine helicopters AgustaWestland Merlin and Lynx Wildcat. It carries a  explosive charge which is powerful enough to punch through the double hulls of modern submarines. It is also integrated on board the Type 23 frigates, deployed by two twin torpedo launchers.

Depth charges
The Mk11 Depth Charge is a depth charge used by Lynx Wildcat or Merlin Mk2 helicopters to attack enemy submarines.

Mine disposal system

Seafox

The unit incorporates a remotely controlled surveillance system in order to identify a target, guided from the parent ship via fibre optic cables. Once a mine has been identified, an expendable autonomous or remote guided unit is guided to the target and detonates a shaped charge to destroy the mine. Four independent reversible motors and a hover thruster provide high manoeuvrability, allowing for exact placement prior to charge detonation. The Seafox has been used by the Royal Navy clearing coastal waters in both Iraq and Libya conflicts.

Anti-aircraft and anti-missile missiles

Sea Ceptor

The Sea Ceptor missile is currently being integrated  into the Type 23 frigates, as a replacement to the Sea Wolf missile. The manufacturer states it has a "wide target set", including the capability to engage small naval vessels, which would give the missile a limited surface-to-surface role. A Royal Navy officer of the Type 23 frigate HMS Westminster stated: "Westminster managed to explore the real potential of the system during her training and to say it is a real game changer is an understatement. Unlike its predecessor, the system is capable of defending ships other than Westminster herself. Whether it’s engaging multiple air threats or fast incoming attack craft, Sea Ceptor represents a massive capability upgrade for the Type 23 frigate."

Sea Viper

The Sea Viper is the main weapon of the Type 45 destroyers.

Internationally, the Sea Viper system is know as Principal Anti-Air Missile System. It comprises the SAMPSON radar, a Combat Management System, S1850M long-range radar, the Sylver vertical launching system and Aster 15 and Aster 30 missiles, which are highly manoeuvrable and capable of speeds over Mach 4.

Anti-ship missiles

Harpoon

The Harpoon anti-ship missile is fitted to  all Type 23 frigates and three Type 45 destroyers in a 2×4 canister configuration. Another two destroyers are fitted for but not with the missiles. The Harpoon was due to go out of service by the end of 2018. However, this has subsequently been revised to at least 2023. As of August 2021, it was reported that, given the age of the Harpoon system, only two Royal Navy destroyers or frigates were carrying a full complement of 8 Harpoon missiles per ship. These were the frigates HMS Kent and HMS Montrose. In August 2022, it was reported that in preparation for her planned deployment to the Persian Gulf to replace HMS Montrose, HMS Lancaster had also been fitted with a full complement of 8 Harpoon anti-ship missiles. In September 2022, HMS Westminster fired two Harpoon missiles in Operation Atlantic Thunder 22 in a SinkEx exercise alongside US forces in which the decommissioned US frigate USS Boone was sunk in the North Atlantic.

The permanent replacement for Harpoon will be the FC/ASW (Future Cruise/Anti Ship Weapon), first announced in 2016, it will fly at hypersonic speed and will equip the new Type 26 frigates from 2028. In October 2021 this was put on hold, then it was announced in November that the introduction of these weapons may be delayed until the 2030s.

In March 2019 it was announced that an interim replacement for Harpoon would equip five of the Type 23 frigates. In November 2022, UK Secretary of State for Defence, Ben Wallace, confirmed that Norway's Naval Strike Missile would be purchased to equip a total of eleven of the Royal Navy's Type 23 frigates and Type 45 destroyers.

Martlet

The Martlet is a lightweight air-to-surface and surface-to-surface missile under development by Thales Air Defence for the United Kingdom. As of 2021, Martlet is entering service on the Fleet Air Arm's AgustaWestland AW159 Wildcat in the air-to-surface mode with up to twenty Martlet missiles envisaged for deployment on a single Wildcat helicopter. The missile is intended to counter light fast attack boats.

The Martlet has also been tested in the surface-to-surface mode on the Type 23 frigate, using a launcher mounted on the side of the 30 mm cannon, as a relatively inexpensive missile to use against small craft and unmanned aerial vehicles.

Sea Venom

The Sea Venom is a helicopter-launched lightweight anti-ship missile developed by MBDA to replace the Sea Skua. Sea Venom missiles were reported deployed with Royal Navy Wildcat helicopters operating as part of the Royal Navy's carrier strike group in 2021. It is optimized to attack fast inshore attack craft (FIAC), however it can also damage targets up to corvette size.

Land attack missiles

Tomahawk missile

The Tomahawk missile, also known as TLAM (Tomahawk Land Attack Cruise Missile), allows the Navy's submarines to strike at targets on land accurately. The missile has been in use with the Royal Navy since the late 1990s and has been used in the Kosovo conflict and in the campaigns in the War in Afghanistan and Iraq. It is fired from a boat's torpedo tubes. Once it reaches the surface, a booster rocket ignites to propel the missile skywards.

The Tomahawk IV is the latest version of the missile. It has a longer range than its predecessors and can be directed at a new target in-flight, and can also beam back images of the battlefield. In British service it is fitted to all  and -class submarines. It is currently planned to be phased out of service in the United States Navy, with no more weapons to be produced after 2015, meaning that it may no longer be an option for the Royal Navy from around the end of the decade. The UK last bought 65 Tomahawk Land Attack Missiles in July 2014.

Trident II D5 ballistic missile

The Trident nuclear missile is Britain's nuclear deterrent. Each Vanguard boat can carry up to sixteen missiles, and each missile can deliver up to eight warheads. Each variable yield warhead can have a yield up to 100 kt.

See also

List of active Royal Navy ships
List of Royal Navy equipment

References

External links
 Royal Navy (royalnavy.mod.uk)
 Royal Navy — The Equipment — Ships (royalnavy.mod.uk)

Naval weapons of the United Kingdom